Ek Ladki Anjaani Si is an Indian television series which aired on Sony Entertainment Television.

Plot
Anu is a very motivated, talented, and daring teenager that would do anything to fulfil her dreams. Ek Ladki Anjaani Si is a Hindi television series that shows the unique story of an eighteen-year-old girl, named Anu. The genre of this series is drama. The main protagonist,  Anu, is played by (Kanchi Kaul) later played by Sai Deodhar.

Cast
 Kanchi Kaul  as Ananya Sachdev Samarth or Anu (2005-2006)
 Shakti Anand as Nikhil Samarth
 Arzoo Govitrikar as Tulika Samarth
 Karishma Tanna as Ayesha
 Sai Deodhar as Ananya Sachdev Samarth or Anu (2006-2007)
 Cezanne Khan as Dr. Dhruv Modi
 Vaishnavi Mahant as Meera Sachdev
 Mohnish Bahl as Veer
 Niyati Joshi as Mrs. Samarth (Nikhil's mother)
 Vikas Bhalla as Akshay
 Vishal Singh as Yash
 Amrapali Gupta as Riya (Rajesh's daughter)
 Vishal Watwani
 Swati Anand
 Akshay Anand as Abhimanyu
 Rio Kapadia
 Himani Shivpuri
 Hasan Zaidi
 Nigaar Khan
 Sanjeev Seth as Rajesh (Meera's boyfriend)

References

External links 

Indian television series based on non-Indian television series
2005 Indian television series debuts
2007 Indian television series endings
Indian television soap operas
Sony Entertainment Television original programming